John W. Kyle State Park is a state park in the U.S. state of Mississippi. It is named after John W. Kyle, a former Mississippi state senator and a former U.S. Representative from Mississippi.

Activities and amenities
The park features boating and fishing on  Sardis Reservoir, 200 campsites, 20 cabins, visitors center, picnic area, and an 18-hole regulation golf course, Mallard Pointe.

References

External links
John W. Kyle State Park Mississippi Department of Fisheries, Wildlife, and Parks

State parks of Mississippi
Protected areas of Panola County, Mississippi